Diamond Shamrock Corp. or Diamond Shamrock Refining and Marketing was an oil refinery and gas station company in the United States, headquartered in San Antonio, Texas.

Since 2001, it operates as a brand of Valero and has withdrawn the brand from a majority of Texas gas stations and had converted most of the stores to Valero or sold them off to Texaco or other companies.

History
The origins of Diamond Shamrock can be traced back to three foundation companies: Diamond Alkali, Shamrock Oil and Gas, and Sigmor Corporation.

1910-1983

Diamond Alkali

In 1910 a group of glass manufacturers founded Diamond Alkali in Pittsburgh, Pennsylvania. They wanted the company to produce soda ash, a key ingredient in glass production. A factory was built in Painesville, Ohio, in 1912 to produce soda ash.
During the 1920s, TR Evans led Diamond Alkali, which under his leadership became an important chemical producer.
After World War II Ray Evans, TR's son, led the company to decentralize its operations. In Deer Park, Houston, Texas, in 1946 a new plant was built to produce Chlorine and Caustic soda. In 1948 the company moved its headquarters from Pittsburgh to Cleveland, Ohio. During the 1950s a third plant was constructed in Muscle Shoals, Alabama, helping the company continue to enlarge its range of products, expanding to produce plastics and chemicals for agriculture.
The 1960s saw continued expansion of Diamond Alkali. A facility was opened in Delaware City, Delaware and additional chemical companies were purchased, including Chemical Process Company of Redwood City, California and the Nopco Chemical Company of New Jersey. In 1967 Diamond Alkali merged with Shamrock Oil and Gas of Amarillo. At the time of the merger the company produced about 20 percent oil and gas and 80 percent chemicals. In 1978 Diamond Shamrock moved its headquarters to Dallas. By 1980 Diamond Shamrock had about 12,400 employees in thirty-seven countries.

Shamrock Oil and Gas

John Sheerin founded Shamrock Oil and Gas on August 9, 1929. As a native of Ireland he named the company after the symbol of his country of origin. The company was financed by the Fownes family of Pennsylvania and headquartered in Amarillo. The early years of the company were difficult experiencing a loss of about $9 million. In 1933 Shamrock built its first refinery and its first gas station, both in Sunray, Moore County, Texas. James Harold Dunn joined the company in 1938 as a vice president and general manager, having previously been an engineer at the Lone Star Gas Corporation. The following year Shamrock showed its first, albeit small, profit. During 1939-1940 Lone Star and Shamrock cooperated on the construction of a plant at Murchison in Henderson County whose aim was to recycle natural gas. In 1943 the company paid its first dividend, and by 1944 the company was listed on the NYSE. In 1945 Dunn became the company president, a post he had for ten years. In 1955 C. A. Cash succeeded him, and in 1959 Shamrock opened its first catalytic cracking unit in Sunray.

In 1960 Shamrock purchased a large number of gas stations from the chain of Sigmor.

Sigmor
During the 1930s and 1940s, Sigfried "Sig" Moore operated the chain. In 1943 Moore loaned Thomas E. Turner, an employee, money to launch his own business. Turner decided to use the name Sigmor for the chain of stores he established during the 1940s and 1950s. In 1952 Sigmor was incorporated. In 1959, a restructuring took place which allowed each individual gas station to incorporate separately. In 1960, most of the chain was purchased by Shamrock and then leased back to Turner, who continued to lead the company. In 1978 Sigmor purchased its stations back from Diamond Shamrock, continuing to market DS products.
By 1983 Sigmor was one of the largest independent service-station chains in the USA.

Diamond Shamrock
The merger gave Diamond Shamrock 600 retail outlets, plus the Three Rivers oil refinery which was built by Sigmor during the 1970s. In 1987 The Diamond Shamrock Refining and Marketing Company severed ties with Diamond Shamrock Corporation, which was the parent company, and became independent with its headquarters in San Antonio. At that time, as part of the reorganization, Diamond Shamrock Corporation became Maxus Energy Corporation, severing all legal ties to the Diamond Shamrock Refining and Marketing Company. 
In 1990 Diamond Shamrock Refining and Marketing Company shortened its name to Diamond Shamrock, Incorporated, as it had taken the step of incorporating at that time.

1985–2001
In 1985 the company had a $604.7 million loss. It restructured itself in the year before December 1986. On Wednesday December 3, 1986 T. Boone Pickens offered to buy Diamond Shamrock for $2 billion. Kit Freiden of the Associated Press stated "some analysts predicted the giant energy company would reject the offer."

In 1988 the company's annual refinery sales were $1.8 billion. Diamond Shamrock owned and operated 529 stores. 423 of them were in Texas, with 94 of them in Greater Houston. The company owned an additional 64 stores in Colorado. In 1988 the company bought from investor F. Philip Handy 80 Tenneco gasoline stations, with 30 of them in Houston. According to the plans, the Tenneco stores would be rebranded as Diamond Shamrocks.

In 1995 Diamond Shamrock had 2,000 stores, with most of them in Texas, Colorado, New Mexico, and Louisiana. Of them, over 170 stores were in Houston. That year, Diamond Shamrock bought the National Convenience Stores Stop N Go chain for $260 million. The plans called for the combined company to be headquartered in San Antonio. The combined company was to have two refineries in Texas, 11,000 employees, and 2,600 stores.

In 1996, Canadian company Ultramar bought Diamond Shamrock for $1.96 billion in stock and assumed debt.  The combined company was renamed "Ultramar Diamond Shamrock". Diamond Shamrock also sold Total Petroleum, which started in Alma, Michigan, to Marathon Petroleum in 1999.

Valero Energy Corporation acquired Ultramar Diamond Shamrock in 2001.

2021–present (revival)
Beginning in Early 2021, Valero revived the Diamond Shamrock brand and gave a new logo and design to be relevant to the 2018 Valero rebrand for the brand with new locations in California, Georgia, New Mexico and Texas.

References

External links
 

Economy of the Western United States
Gas stations in the United States
1967 establishments in the United States
Retail companies established in 1967
Automotive fuel retailers
Defunct companies based in Cleveland
1996 mergers and acquisitions